The music of Uzbekistan has reflected the diverse influences that have shaped the country. It is very similar to the music of the Middle East and is characterized by complicated rhythms and meters. Because of the long history of music in the country and the large variety of music styles and musical instruments, Uzbekistan is often regarded as one of the most musically diverse countries in Central Asia.

Classical music of Uzbekistan 
The music of what is now Uzbekistan has a very long and rich history. Shashmaqam, a Central Asian classical music style, is believed to have arisen in the cities of Bukhara and Samarqand in the late 16th century. The term "shashmaqam" translates as six maqams and refers to the structure of music with six sections in different musical modes, similar to classical Persian traditional music. Interludes of spoken Sufi poetry interrupt the music, typically beginning at a low register and gradually ascending to a climax before calming back down to the beginning tone.

After Turkestan became part of the Russian Empire in the 19th century, first attempts were taken to record national melodies of Turkestan. Russian musicians helped preserve these melodies by introducing musical notation in the region.

In the 1950s, Uzbek folk music became less popular, and the genre was barred from radio stations by the Soviets. They did not completely dispel the music. Although banned, folk musical groups continued to play their music in their own ways and spread it individually. After Uzbekistan gained independence from the USSR in the early 1990s, public interest revived in traditional Uzbek music. Nowadays Uzbek television and radio stations regularly play traditional music.

The people's Artist of Uzbekistan Turgun Alimatov is an Uzbek classical and folklore composer, and tanbur, dutar, and sato player. His compositions include "Segah", "Chorgoh", "Buzruk", "Navo", and "Tanovar". His image is associated with national pride and has been presented as the symbol of Uzbek classical music to the world.

Another well-known Uzbek composer is Muhammadjon Mirzayev. His most famous compositions include "Bahor valsi" ("The Spring Waltz") and "Sarvinoz". "Bahor valsi" is played on Uzbek television and radio channels every spring.

Sherali Joʻrayev is a singer of traditional Uzbek music. However, he has fallen out of favour with the Uzbek government, who have banned his performances on Uzbek TV as well as his public performances since 2002. He still performs at Uzbek wedding parties and in other countries to popular acclaim.

In recent years, singers such as Yulduz Usmonova and Sevara Nazarkhan have brought Uzbek music to global audiences by mixing traditional melodies with modern rhythms and instrumentation. In the late 2000s, Ozodbek Nazarbekov mixed contemporary music with elements of traditional Uzbek music.

Western Classical music in Uzbekistan 
Uzbekistan has also produced many notable composers and performers in the European classical art music idiom, and is home to notable symphony orchestras, festivals, and contemporary music ensembles. The State Conservatory of Uzbekistan, based in Tashkent and founded in 1936, is the nation's leading higher education institution for the professional training of musicians.

Contemporary music of Uzbekistan 
Many forms of popular music, including folk music, pop, and rock music, have particularly flourished in Uzbekistan since the early 1990s. Uzbek pop music is well developed, and enjoys mainstream success via pop music media and various radio stations.

Many Uzbek singers such as Sevara Nazarkhan and Sogdiana Fedorinskaya, Rayhon Ganieva have achieved commercial success not only in Uzbekistan but also in other CIS countries such as Kazakhstan, Russia, and Tajikistan.

Rock

Currently rock music enjoys less popularity than pop music in Uzbekistan.

An Uzbekistani metal band who has some degree of recognition is Night Wind, a folk metal group. Other Uzbekistani metal groups include Iced Warm, Salupa, Zindan, and Agoniya.

Rap
Rap music has become popular among Uzbek youth. Rappers such as Shoxrux became very popular among young people in the 2000s. However, the Uzbek government censors rap music. It has set up a special body to censor rap music because it believes this type of music does not fit the Uzbek musical culture.

Musicians 
 Ari Babakhanov
 Lola Astanova

Artists and bands

Uzbek artists 

 Alisher Uzoqov
 Anvar Gʻaniyev
 Botir Zokirov
 Botir Khusanbaev
 Eson Kandov
 Daler Xonzoda

 Feruza Jumaniyozova

 Lola Yoʻldosheva
 Rayhon 
 Sevara Nazarkhan
Yulduz Turdiyeva
  Ozodbek Nazarbekov
  Botir Qodirov 
  Xamdam Sobirov

Uzbek bands 
 Bolalar
 Dado
 Night Wind
 Yalla
 Benom 
  Ummon

Composers in the western classical tradition
 Dilorom Saidaminova 
Dmitri Yanov-Yanovsky
 Felix Yanov-Yanovsky
 Mirsodiq Tojiyev
 Mutavakkil Burhonov
 Polina Medyulyanova

Instruments

Many musical instruments are played in Uzbekistan. Traditional instruments include:

String

 Dutor (long-necked fretted lute)
 Rubob (long-necked fretted lute)
 Tanbur (long-necked fretted lute)
 Tor (long-necked fretted lute) 
 Ud (long-necked fretted lute)
 Gʻijjak (spike fiddle)
 Chang (struck zither)

Wind
dili tuiduk
 Karnay (long trumpet)
 Nay (side-blown flute)
 Qoʻshnay (clarinetlike instrument made from reed)
 Surnay (loud oboe)

Percussion

 Doira (frame drum)
 Dovul (drum)
 Nogʻora (pot-shaped drum covered with leather on the top)
 Qoshiq (spoons)
 Zang (bracelets)

References

External links 
 Uzbek Modern Music, Website dedicated to modern popular Uzbek music
 Uzbek Classical Music, Website dedicated to traditional Uzbek music
 History of Uzbek music, Oriental Express
 Uzbek Music by Mark Dickens, Oxus Communications
 Uzbek musical instruments, the Museum of Applied Arts of Uzbekistan
 Listen to the sounds of Uzbek musical instruments, Tours of Uzbekistan
Eurasian music science journal, scientific journal of music research founded by The state conservatory of Uzbekistan

 
Uzbekistani